Paraleptophlebia submarginata is a species of prong-gilled mayfly in the family Leptophlebiidae.

Description
The front wings are triangular and quite long, while the back wings are much smaller, about a third of the front wings, and rather round in shape. The head is perpendicular to the body axis, with the eyes on the side. At the back of the rear body there are three long cerci, reaching  in males,  in females. They have short bristles on both sides.

Distribution and habitat
This species is very abundant in the upper and middle rivers and streams with stony ground of most of Europe. It is present in Albania, Andorra, Austria, Belarus, Belgium, Bosnia and Herzegovina, Bulgaria, Croatia, Czech Republic, Denmark, Estonia, Faroe Islands, France, Germany, Gibraltar, Greece, Hungary, Ireland, Isle of Man, Italy, Jersey, Latvia, Liechtenstein, Lithuania, Luxembourg, Macedonia, Malta, Moldova, Montenegro, Netherlands, Norway, Poland, Portugal, Romania, Serbia, Slovakia, Slovenia, Spain, Sweden, Switzerland, Ukraine, United Kingdom.

Biology and behavior
Females of Paraleptophlebia submarginata lay eggs onto the water surface. Eggs sink immediately to the bottom. These mayfly lives most of its life as larvae or nymphs. Larvae usually stay in the moss lawn of stones. They eat small particles of organic matter, such as algae, plant residues or decaying plants. Subimago live about 20 hours, imago up to 3 days. Adults can be found from early April to mid-September. At the rest the wings are held straight up and out of the body. Adults do not feed at all. Males rarely live more than one day.

References 

Herbert W. Ludwig: Tiere und Pflanzen unserer Gewässer. BLV Verlagsgesellschaft, München 2003,

External links

 Encyclopedia of life

Mayflies
Insects described in 1835